Khanty-Mansiysk Airport , also listed as Khantymansiysk Airport, is an airport in Khanty-Mansi Autonomous Okrug, Russia located 5 km northeast of Khanty-Mansiysk. It services medium-size airliners.

Utair's head office is located at the airport.

Airlines and destinations

References

External links

YugraAvia official site

Airports built in the Soviet Union
Airports in Khanty-Mansi Autonomous Okrug